Yasser El Halaby (born September 30, 1984 in Cairo) is an Egyptian professional squash player.

Career
El Halaby attended Princeton University from 2002-2006. He won the College Squash Association individual championships for an unprecedented four straight times. He also was a member of a squad that almost toppled the Trinity College (Connecticut) squash team's 100+ match win streak, but he failed to convert four match balls against Freshman Gustav Detter and lost (however, it was later noted that El Halaby was competing with two torn Achilles tendons).

El Halaby represented Egypt at the international level. He reached a career-high ranking of World No. 40 in February 2008.

References

External links 
 
 

1984 births
Living people
Egyptian male squash players
Princeton Tigers men's squash players
Princeton University alumni
21st-century Egyptian people